Anthene onias is a butterfly in the family Lycaenidae. It is found in the Democratic Republic of the Congo (Uele, Ituri, Tshopo, Sankuru and Lualaba).

References

Butterflies described in 1924
Anthene
Endemic fauna of the Democratic Republic of the Congo
Butterflies of Africa